Natural elements or Natural Elements may refer to:

In science
 Chemical elements that are not synthesised
 Classical element, the concept in ancient Greece of earth, water, air or fire
 Natural abundance, the relative amounts of isotopes of a chemical element
 Abundance of the chemical elements, the relative occurrence of chemical elements

In entertainment
 Natural Elements (Acoustic Alchemy album), 1988
 Natural Elements (Shakti album), 1977 
 Natural Elements (hip hop group), an underground group from New York City